Charles Logue (1858–1919) was an Irish immigrant to the United States who founded the Charles Logue Building Company.  It constructed dozens of churches in and around Boston, as well as Fenway Park.  It was "one of the top building firms in Boston and [Logue] was the man behind some of the city’s premier construction projects."

Logue was born in Derry, Ireland, and died while inspecting the roof of St. Mary's Church in Dedham, Massachusetts.

References

1858 births
1919 deaths
American construction businesspeople
Irish emigrants to the United States (before 1923)
Businesspeople from Derry (city)
19th-century American businesspeople